Erasmo is a given name. Notable people with the name include:

Claudio Erasmo Vargas (born 1974), Mexican race walker
Erasmo Carlos (born 1941), Brazilian singer and songwriter
Erasmo Catarino (born 1977), Mexican singer, winner on the TV show La Academia 4
Erasmo de Sequeira (died 1997), politician, social worker and parliamentarian from Goa, India
Erasmo Escala (1826–1884), Chilean soldier, commander-in-chief of the Army during part of the War of the Pacific
Erasmo Fuentes (born 1943), Mexican-born sculptor who lives in Utah
Erasmo of Narni (1370–1443), one of the condottieri or mercenaries in the Italian Renaissance
Erasmo Oneglia (1853–1934), Italian printer and stamp forger
Erasmo Ramirez (left-handed pitcher) (born 1976), Major League Baseball left-handed relief pitcher
Erasmo Ramírez (right-handed pitcher) (born 1990), Major League Baseball pitcher
 Erasmo Salemme (born 1946), Italian volleyball player and coach
Erasmo Seguín (1782–1857), prominent citizen and politician in San Antonio de Bexar, Spanish Texas
Erasmo Solórzano (born 1985), Mexican soccer player
Stacey D'Erasmo (born 1961), American novelist and literary critic

See also
Sant'Erasmo (disambiguation), disambiguation page
Stadio Erasmo Iacovone, multi-use stadium in Taranto, Italy
Erasmus, Dutch Renaissance humanist